János Murányi (born January 13, 1944 in Mezőkövesd, Borsod-Abaúj-Zemplén) is a retired male discus thrower from Hungary. He represented his native country at the 1972 Summer Olympics in Munich, where he ended up in 12th place in the overall-rankings. Murányi is best known for winning the gold medal in the men's discus event at the 1970 Summer Universiade in Torino, Italy.

References

1944 births
Living people
Hungarian male discus throwers
Athletes (track and field) at the 1972 Summer Olympics
Olympic athletes of Hungary
Universiade medalists in athletics (track and field)
Universiade gold medalists for Hungary
Medalists at the 1970 Summer Universiade